Milan Welte (born 30 June 2001) is a German tennis player.

Welte has a career high ATP singles ranking of 863 achieved on 19 July 2020.

Welte made his ATP main draw debut at the 2020 Hamburg European Open in the doubles draw partnering Marvin Möller after the pair received entry into the main draw as lucky losers.

ATP Challenger and ITF Futures/World Tennis Tour finals

Doubles: 1 (0–1)

References

External links

2001 births
Living people
German male tennis players